The 2022 Chatham Cup is New Zealand's 94th annual knockout football competition.

It will have a preliminary round and four rounds proper before quarter-finals, semi-finals, and a final.

Structure

Results

Preliminary round
Matches were played over the Anzac weekend of 22–25 April. This round contained five teams from the Auckland Sunday football leagues, AFC Bohemian Celtic, Ellerslie Tropics, Sperm Whales FC, University of Auckland FC, and Zamantix Rovers Duece, the lowest ranked teams left in the competition.

Northern Region

Central Region

Capital Region

Mainland Region

All teams listed below received byes to the first round.
Northern Region: Albany United, Auckland City FC, Auckland United, Bay Olympic, Beachlands Maraetai AFC, Birkenhead United, Bucklands Beach, Cambridge FC, Claudelands Rovers, East Coast Bays, Eastern Suburbs, Ellerslie AFC, Fencibles United, Franklin United, Hamilton Wanderers, Hibiscus Coast, Manukau United, Manurewa AFC, Melville United AFC, Metro FC, Mt Albert Ponsonby AFC, Ngaruawahia United, North Shore United, Northern Rovers, Northland FC, Onehunga Mangere United, Oratia United, Takapuna AFC, Tauranga City, Tauranga Old Blues FC, Waiheke United, Waitemata FC, West Auckland AFC, West Coast Rangers, Western Springs
Central Region: N/a

Capital Region: Brooklyn Northern United, Havelock North Wanderers, Island Bay United, Kapiti Coast United, Lower Hutt City, Isles Construction Massey University, Miramar Rangers, Napier City Rovers, North Wellington, Petone FC, Seatoun AFC, Stokes Valley, Stop Out, Tawa AFC, Upper Hutt City Football, Victoria University, Waikanae AFC, Wainuiomata AFC, Waterside Karori, Wellington Olympic, Wellington United, Western Suburbs
Mainland Region: Burwood AFC, Cashmere Technical, Christchurch United, Coastal Spirit, FC Twenty 11, Ferrymead Bays, Halswell United, Mosgiel AFC, Nelson Suburbs, Nomads United, Parklands United, Roslyn Wakari, Selwyn United, Tahuna FC
Southern Region: Dunedin City Royals, Gore Wanderers, Grants Braes AFC, Green Island, Northern AFC, Old Boys AFC, Otago University, Queens Park, Queenstown AFC, Wanaka AFC

Round 1
Round 1 matches were played between 14 and 15 May 2022. This round contained one team from the Auckland Sunday football leagues, Sperm Whales FC, the lowest ranked team left in the competition.

Northern Region

Central Region

Capital Region

Mainland Region

Southern Region

All teams listed below received byes to the second round.
Northern Region: Auckland City, Auckland United, Bay Olympic, Birkenhead United, Eastern Suburbs, Fencibles United, Hamilton Wanderers, Manukau United, Melville United, North Shore United, Takapuna, Waiheke United, Western Springs, 
Capital Region: Napier City Rovers, North Wellington, Petone, Miramar Rangers, Waterside Karori, Western Suburbs
Mainland: None
Southern: Dunedin City Royals, Green Island, Mosgiel, Queenstown AFC

Round 2
All matches will be played on Queen's Birthday weekend 4-6 June 2022. This round contained one team from the Auckland Sunday football leagues, Sperm Whales FC, the lowest ranked team left in the competition.

Northern Region

Capital / Central Region

Mainland Region

Southern Region

Round 3
All matches were played on the weekend of 18–19 June 2022. This round contained three teams from level 5, Central United, Papamoa FC and Wellington Marist, the lowest ranked teams left in the competition.

Northern Region

Central / Capital Region

Mainland

Southern Region

Round 4
All matches will be played on the weekend of 9–10 July 2022. This round featured 16 teams from the National League regional leagues (level 2) including two competing in the Championship phase (level 1).

Northern Region

Capital / Central Region

Mainland / Southern Region

Quarter-finals
The quarter-finals were be played on 30 July 2022. This round featured eight teams from the National League regional leagues (level 2) including two competing in the Championship phase (level 1).

Semi-finals
The semi-finals was played on the weekend of the 20/21 August 2022. This round featured four teams from the National League regional leagues (level 2) including two competing in the Championship phase (level 1).

Final
The finals is to be played on the 11 September 2022. The game features two teams from the National League regional leagues (level 2) including one competing in the Championship phase (level 1).

Notes
The tiers that teams are in (as indicated in brackets next to their name) are based on the New Zealand football league system for the 2022 season. As some teams can qualify and play in more than one league (and tier) per season, the highest tier that they take part in is the one noted next to their name.

References

External links
Chatham Cup section on the New Zealand Football website

Chatham Cup
Chatham Cup
Chatham Cup
New Zealand, Chatham Cup
New Zealand, Chatham Cup